Lorenzo Staiti (born 27 February 1987) is an Italian footballer who plays for Reggiana as a midfielder.

Career
Staiti began his senior career with Bassano Virtus. In 2009, he joined Sambonifacese. Two years later, Staiti signed with Virtus Entella and was part of the team which won the promotion to the Serie B in 2014.

References

External links
 

1987 births
Sportspeople from Treviso
Living people
Italian footballers
Association football midfielders
Bassano Virtus 55 S.T. players
A.C. Sambonifacese players
Virtus Entella players
FeralpiSalò players
Serie B players
Serie C players
Footballers from Veneto